Johann David Köhler (18 January 1684 – 10 March 1755) was a German historian. His academic focuses were on Roman coins as historical artifacts, ancient weapons, and genealogy. Köhler also served as university librarian at Altdorf and contributed to the early library science literature.

Life

Köhler was born in Colditz in the Electorate of Saxony and studied at the University of Wittenberg. He was a professor of logic and history at universities in Altdorf and later Göttingen and served briefly as university librarian at Altdorf. He died in Göttingen.

Influence

Köhler came into scholarly prominence in a transitional period for European scholarship. From the Middle Ages and into the Enlightenment, European scholars were part of a "common culture of scholarship", a respublica litteraria (Eskildsen 2005: 421).  That common culture of scholarship was subjected to a series of nationalistic and religious pressures across the eighteenth century so that as Köhler came into prominence in the eighteenth century, there had been a shift from the pan-European imagined community to a more parochial nationalist one (Anderson 1991).

His credentials as a library and information scientist are based upon three of his monographs: Syllogie aliquot Scriptorum de bene ordinanda et ornanda Bibliotheca, published in 1728; Hochverdiente und aus bewährten Urkunden wohlbeglaubte Ehren-Rettung Johann Guttenbergs, eingebohrnen Bürgers in Mayntz in 1741; and Anweisung für reisende Gelerte, Bibliothecken, Münz-Cabinette, Antiquitäten-Zimmer, Bilder-Sale, Naturalien-  und Kunst-Kammern, u.d.m mit Nutzen zubesehen from 1762. The 1728 Syllogie… is a bibliographic examination of major history texts of the day and is in keeping with the role of historians then and now. The 1741 Hochverdiente… is an examination of the assertion that Johann Gutenberg was indeed the inventor of movable type – the printing press – against competing claims. Bernhard von Mallinckrodt (1591-1664) is credited with writing the first defense of Gutenberg as the inventor of the printing press in 1639 (Schmidmaier 2001), but Köhler is said to have authored second and definitive defense (Eck 2000). Köhler's third and most important work within this context is the 1792 Anweisung für reisende Gelerte, Bibliothecken, Műnz-Cabinette, Antiquitäten-Zimmer, Bilder-Sale, Naturalien und Kunst-Kammern, u.d.m mit Nutzen zubesehen.

Finally, Köhler published a scholarly journal on Roman coins and numismatics in general. His son Johann Tobias Köhler continued that interest. This journal is important to library science in that it is among the first true serials ever published.

Works 
 Orbis terrarum in nuce, sive Compendium historiae civilis chronologicum in sculptura memoriali
 1719: Bequemer Schul- und Reise-Atlas. Nürnberg: Christoph Weigel
 1724: Anleitung zu der verbesserten neuen Geographie, vornemlich zum Gebrauch der Weigelschen Landcharten. Nürnberg: Christoph Weigel
 1726: Genealogische Geschichte der Herren und Grafen von Wolfstein
 1730: Kurze und gründliche Anleitung zu der alten und mittleren Geographie. Nürnberg: Christoph Weigel

References 

Anderson, Benedict (1991). Imagined Communities: Reflections on the Origin and Spread of Nationalism, rev. ed. London: Verso.
Eck, Reimer (2000) "Drei Schritte Göttinger Frühdruckforschung, Johann David Köhlers 'Ehren-Rettung Johann Guttensberg', Karl Dziatzkos Wiederbelebung der Gutenbergforschung, Elmar Mittlers Digitalisierung der Göttinger Schlüsseldokumente zur Erforschung des Frühdrucks", in Köhler, Johann David (1741, reprint 2000), Hochverdiente und aus bewährten Urkunden wohlbeglaubte Ehren-Rettung Johann Guttenbergs, eingebohrnen Bürgers in Mayntz…, with afterword by Reimer Eck. Munich: Saur, pp. 109–121.
Eskildsen, Kaspar (2005) "How Germany Left the Republic of Letters", Journal of the History of Ideas, vol. 65, 3, pp. 421–432.
Schmidmaier, Dieter (2001) "Johann David Köhlers Verdienst", Bibliothek Forschung und Praxis, vol. 25, 2, pp. 253–255

Further reading
 Michael Diefenbacher, Markus Heinz, Ruth Bach-Damaskinos: „auserlesene und allerneueste Landkarten“. Der Verlag Homann in Nürnberg 1702–1848. Nürnberg: Tümmels 2002, S. 52
 Johann Gabriel Doppelmayr: Historische Nachricht von den Nürnbergischen Mathematicis und Künstlern. Nürnberg, 1730 Peter Conrad Monath
 Georg Andreas Will: Nürnbergisches Gelehrtenlexikon Bd. 1. Nürnberg: Lorenz Schüpfel 1755, S. 304-314
 Christian Gottlieb Jöcher: Allgemeines Gelehrten-Lexikon. Fortsetzungen und Ergänzungen von J. C. Adelung. Bd. 3. 1810.
 Thomas Nicklas: "Johann David Köhler (1684–1755), Historiker". In: Fränkische Lebensbilder; 16 (1996). S. 79—93.
 Thomas Nicklas: "Der Historiker Johann David Köhler (1684–1755) und die Geschichte des gräflichen Hauses Wolfstein". In: Verhandlungen des Historischen Vereins für Oberpfalz und Regensburg;  135, 1995, S. 77—83.
 Detlev Hölscher: "Johann David Köhler, 1684-1755. Porträt eines bedeutenden Numismatikers des 18. Jahrhunderts". In: Münzen Revue; 26, 1994, H. 6, S. 728-737.

External links

 Hathi Trust. Works by Köhler

1684 births
1755 deaths
People from Colditz
German numismatists
German classical scholars
People from the Electorate of Saxony
University of Wittenberg alumni
Academic staff of the University of Altdorf
Academic staff of the University of Göttingen
German genealogists
German male non-fiction writers